Kalama (kaw-law-maw) is a city in Cowlitz County, Washington, United States. It is part of the Longview, Washington Metropolitan Statistical Area. The population was 2,959 as of the 2020 census.

Etymology
James W. Phillips' Washington State Place Names states,  "General J.W. Sprague of the Northern Pacific Railroad named the town in 1871 for the Indian word calama, meaning "pretty maiden." There is an additional story: Gabriel Franchère, in 1811, wrote of the Indian village at the mouth of the Kalama River, adding that it was called Thlakalamah (this story predates all of the others).

History
Kalama was first settled by Native Americans, particularly members of the Cowlitz Indian Tribes. The first white settler recorded was in 1853. That first settler was Ezra Meeker and his family. Only one year later, Meeker moved to north Puyallup, Washington, but he sold his Donation Land Claim to a Mr. Davenport, who, with a few others, permanently settled in the Kalama area. In early 1870, Northern Pacific Railway scouts came to Cowlitz County to find an ideal terminus along the Columbia River. After a failed negotiation for a Donation Land Claim in Martin's Bluff, four miles south of Kalama, Northern Pacific officials purchased 700 acres in Kalama for the terminus of the new railroad as well as a new headquarters. The population swelled with employees of the Northern Pacific Railway.

Kalama was entirely a Northern Pacific railroad creation. It was unofficially born in May 1870 when the Northern Pacific railroad turned the first shovel of dirt. Northern Pacific built a dock, a sawmill, a car shop, a roundhouse, a turntable, hotels, a hospital, stores, homes. In just a few months in 1870, the working population skyrocketed to approximately 3,500 and the town had added tents, saloons, a brewery, and a gambling hall. Soon the town had a motto: "Rail Meets Sail". Recruiters went to San Francisco and recruited Chinese labor, who moved to their own Chinatown in a part of Kalama now called China Gardens. The population of Kalama peaked at 5,000 people, but in early 1874, the railroad moved its headquarters to Tacoma, and by 1877, only 700 people remained in Kalama.

Kalama was unofficially incorporated on November 29, 1871. It served as the county seat of Cowlitz County from 1872 to 1922. Kalama was the northern terminus of a railroad ferry operated by the Northern Pacific Railway from Goble, Oregon. This was a critical link in rail service between 1883 when the service began until 1909 when the major rail bridges in Portland were completed. Kalama originated with a stake driven by Gen. John W. Sprague of the Northern Pacific Railway who in March 1870 selected a spot near the mouth of the Kalama river to mark the beginning point of Northern Pacific's Pacific Division. From that stake, the Northern Pacific began building north to Puget Sound, ultimately reaching Commencement Bay at what was to become Tacoma before going bankrupt. Construction began in April 1871 with a crew of 800 men, with the official 'first spike' being driven in May 1871   Scheduled service from Tacoma to Kalama began on January 5, 1874. The Portland-Hunters  line was completed about the same time that the ceremonial spike was driven west of Helena, Montana to mark the completion of the transcontinental Northern Pacific Railroad in the fall of 1883.
Hunters  was located near the south end of Sandy Island about a mile south of Goble.   However the crossing times were excessive when the Tacoma had to work against the tide, and the ferry slip was soon moved to Goble at the north end of Sandy Island and directly across from Kalama. The ferry could handle 12 passenger cars or 27 freight cars.

Historic buildings

St. Joseph's Catholic Parish was built in 1874, around the same time the railroad between Kalama and Tacoma first became operational. This was the first and only Catholic Parish in Kalama.

Geography

Highway access to Kalama is provided by Exit 27, Exit 30, and Exit 32 from I-5.  The industrial district is along the river front while the business district is on the east side of I-5.  Residential areas are up the hill to the east and on the cliffs above town, portions of which have dramatic views overlooking the Columbia River.  The busy Portland-Seattle rail connection parallels I-5 to the west on double tracks (or more) all the way through town.

Climate
This region experiences warm (but not hot) and dry summers, with no average monthly temperatures above .  According to the Köppen Climate Classification system, Kalama has a warm-summer Mediterranean climate, abbreviated "Csb" on climate maps.

Demographics

2010 census
As of the census of 2010, there were 2,344 people, 967 households, and 665 families residing in the city. The racial makeup of the city was 91.3% White, 0.6% African American, 1.3% Native American, 1.2% Asian, 0.1% Pacific Islander, 1.8% from other races, and 3.7% from two or more races. Hispanic or Latino of any race were 4.9% of the population.

There were 967 households, of which 31.6% had children under the age of 18 living with them, 52.0% were married couples living together, 11.5% had a female householder with no husband present, 5.3% had a male householder with no wife present, and 31.2% were non-families. 25.4% of all households were made up of individuals, and 10.6% had someone living alone who was 65 years of age or older. The average household size was 2.42 and the average family size was 2.88.

The median age in the city was 41.4 years. 23.5% of residents were under the age of 18; 6.3% were between the ages of 18 and 24; 24% were from 25 to 44; 29.5% were from 45 to 64; and 16.6% were 65 years of age or older. The gender makeup of the city was 48.8% male and 51.2% female.

Montgomery House Bed and Breakfast

The Montgomery House Bed and Breakfast is a house built in 1908 on old Cowlitz Indian lands.  It was featured in a 2009 feature film documentary Montgomery House: The Perfect Haunting by Danielle Egnew.  As of 2013, the house is no longer a bed and breakfast, and is being remodeled.

Notable people
Jackson Gillis, television writer, was born in Kalama.

Anna Kashfi (born Joan O'Callaghan) Brando Hannaford, the first wife of Marlon Brando, was a long-term resident of Kalama until her death. Kashfi and her son Christian Brando are buried in Kalama.

See also
Kalama Middle/High School

References

External links

 Kalama School District

Cities in Washington (state)
Cities in Cowlitz County, Washington
Washington (state) populated places on the Columbia River
Former county seats in Washington (state)
Railway towns in Washington (state)